Bramblett is a surname. Notable people with the surname include:

Earl Bramblett (1942−2003), American mass murderer
Ernest K. Bramblett (1901−1966), American politician
Randall Bramblett (born 1948), American musician and singer-songwriter
Rod Bramblett (1965–2019), American sportscaster